Glos is a commune in the Calvados département, Basse-Normandie region of France.

Glos may also refer to:

 Glös, an American indie rock band
 Gloucestershire, an English county
 Michael Glos (born 1944), German politician

See also 
 GLO (disambiguation)
 Głos (disambiguation)